Mingalar Katin is a 2018 Burmese Comedy-drama film, directed by  Ko Zaw (Ar Yone Oo) starring Myint Myat, Wutt Hmone Shwe Yi, Kyaw Kyaw Bo, Khin Zarchi Kyaw, Khin Hlaing and Ko Pauk.The film, produced by Lucky Seven Film Production premiered in Myanmar on August 10, 2018.

Cast
Myint Myat as Chit Khin
Wutt Hmone Shwe Yi as May Phyu
Kyaw Kyaw Bo as Pay Toe
Khin Zarchi Kyaw as Daw Win Win
Khin Hlaing as Pauk Si
Ko Pauk as U Ba Pyu

References

2018 films
2010s Burmese-language films
Burmese comedy-drama films
Films shot in Myanmar
2018 comedy-drama films